Kiona–Benton High School is a public high school located in Benton City, Washington serving 497 students in grades 9–12. Former professional baseball player Tom Lachmann attended the high school.

References

External links
Kiona–Benton H.S.
Kiona–Benton City School District

Public high schools in Washington (state)
High schools in Benton County, Washington